Xiufeng District is a district of the city of Guilin, Guangxi, China.

Xiufeng District is divided into 3 subdistricts:

 Xiufeng Subdistrict
 Lijun Subdistrict
 Jiashan Subdistrict

Air Guilin has its headquarters in Xiufeng District.

References

County-level divisions of Guangxi
Administrative divisions of Guilin